Betty June (née Whittaker) Hoxsey Justus (May 23, 1923 – August 11, 2011) was an American farmer and politician.

Born in Leland, Illinois, Hoxsey graduated from Ottawa Township High School and then farmed in Serena Township, LaSalle County, Illinois. Hoxsey served in the Illinois House of Representatives from 1977 to 1982 and was a Republican. She died in Peru, Illinois.

Notes

1923 births
2011 deaths
People from LaSalle County, Illinois
Farmers from Illinois
Women state legislators in Illinois
Republican Party members of the Illinois House of Representatives
21st-century American women